Major Minor Records was a Northern Irish record label started by Phil Solomon in 1966. It had a distribution deal with Decca Records. Artists on the label included the Dubliners and Johnny Nash.

Phil Solomon was also co-director of Radio Caroline in the mid-1960s. In August 1967, the Wilson government outlawed pirate radio and, although Radio Caroline continued, it began to heavily promote records from the Major Minor label. Caroline's DJs were unhappy with the type of music they were being forced to play and it is doubtful that much of the revenue from the record label actually went back into the radio station. In March 1968, the two Caroline ships were silenced when they were seized by creditors.

Major Minor's big chart moment came in 1969, when the label picked up a 'dropped' record and took it to Number 1 in the UK Singles Chart. The track, "Je t'aime... moi non plus" by Jane Birkin and Serge Gainsbourg, was originally released on Fontana. Despite being performed in French, the song's obvious sexual tone resulted in a wide-scale ban from mainstream radio stations, and Fontana deleted the single during its chart ascent, allegedly because the wife of Fontana's boss was appalled at her husband's company releasing such a song. Major Minor acquired the licensing rights, and got its best selling single on the back of the controversy. Charles Aznavour is another French artist who worked with Major Minor (a single, "To My Daughter" / "Yesterday When I Was Young", and an LP, Aznavour Sings Aznavour).

Soul and jazz musicians on the label included Dizzy Gillespie, Sam and Dave, the Isley Brothers, Kim Weston and Cissy Houston. Rock artists included July and Them (who were managed by Solomon). There was also an obscure pre-10cc single featuring Eric Stewart credited to the New Wave Band ("Cecilia" / "Free, Free, Free"). Rory Gallagher's band Taste also released a single on the label ("Blister on the Moon" / "Born on the Wrong Side of Time").

A young Peter Sarstedt cut his first single, "My Monkey is a Junkie", for the label, under the name Peter Lincoln. The other big success was Northern Ireland's David McWilliams with "Days of Pearly Spencer", leased from EMI. Other tunes that Caroline had to play included "Sentimental Songs" by Freddie "Parrotface" Davies.

Major Minor's first big UK number one single was "Mony Mony" by Tommy James and the Shondells, in 1968.  The label also scored hits with pianist Neville Dickie, balladeers Karen Young and Malcolm Roberts, and bubblegum band Crazy Elephant.

In July 2010, EMI announced that the label would be resurrected to release an "expanded 20th anniversary" release of Morrissey's Bona Drag.

References

External links
 Overview of Major Minor records
 The Major Minor singles

Record labels established in 1966
Pop record labels
Jazz record labels
Soul music record labels